The 1999–2000 NBA season was the Mavericks' 20th season in the National Basketball Association. This season is especially notable as Mark Cuban purchased the team from Ross Perot Jr. in January 2000. Under Cuban's leadership, the Mavs built a foundation for continued NBA success that eventually led to two Finals appearances (and one championship) in the next decade. During the off-season, the Mavericks re-acquired former center Sean Rooks from the Los Angeles Lakers.

The Mavericks continued to struggle with a 9–23 start, as Gary Trent only played just eleven games due to hamstring and groin injuries, and Hot Rod Williams was out for the entire season with a back injury. However, after the slow start, the team then won 11 of their next 15 games. At midseason, the Mavs signed flamboyant power forward Dennis Rodman on February 3, a month after Cuban bought the team. However, Rodman's behavior issues led to a very short (12 game) tenure in Dallas before he was released to free agency in early March. The Mavericks held a 20–28 record at the All-Star break, then later on won nine of their final ten games in April, and finished fourth in the Midwest Division with a 40–42 record. However, they missed the playoffs for the tenth straight season.

Michael Finley averaged 22.6 points, 6.3 rebounds, 5.3 assists and 1.3 steals per game, and was selected to play in the 2000 NBA All-Star Game in Oakland, while second-year star Dirk Nowitzki showed improvement, averaging 17.5 points and 6.5 rebounds per game, and Cedric Ceballos provided the team with 16.6 points and 6.7 rebounds per game. In addition, Erick Strickland contributed 12.8 points and 1.5 steals per game, while Robert Pack provided with 8.9 points and 5.8 assists per game, but only played just 29 games due to a sprained ankle, Steve Nash contributed 8.6 points and 4.9 assists per game, but only played 56 games due to an ankle injury, Shawn Bradley averaged 8.4 points, 6.5 rebounds and 2.5 blocks per game, and Hubert Davis contributed 7.4 points per game off the bench, while shooting .491 in three-point field goal percentage. Nowitzki also finished in second place in Most Improved Player voting, while Ceballos finished tied in third place in Sixth Man of the Year voting.

Following the season, Ceballos was traded to the Detroit Pistons, while Strickland was traded to the New York Knicks, Rooks was dealt to the Los Angeles Clippers, Pack and Williams were both dealt to the Boston Celtics, who then sent Pack back to his former team, the Denver Nuggets, and released Williams to free agency as he retired.

Draft picks

Roster

Roster Notes
 Center Shawn Bradley holds both American and German citizenship.
 Power forward Dennis Rodman was waived on March 8.
 Forward/center Hot Rod Williams missed the entire season due to a back strain.

Regular season

Standings

z= clinched division title
y= clinched division title
x= clinched playoff spot

Record vs. opponents

Game log

Mark Cuban
On January 15, 2000, Mark Cuban purchased a majority stake in the NBA Dallas Mavericks basketball team for $285 million from H. Ross Perot, Jr.

Dennis Rodman
In the 1999–2000 NBA season, the then 38-year-old power forward was signed by the Dallas Mavericks, meaning that Rodman returned to the place where he grew up. For the Mavericks, he played 12 games, was ejected twice and alienated the franchise with his erratic behavior until he was waived again; Dallas guard Steve Nash commented that Rodman "never wanted to be [a Maverick]" and therefore was unmotivated.

Player statistics

Award winners
 Michael Finley, NBA All-Star Game

Transactions

References

 Mavericks on Database Basketball
 Mavericks on Basketball Reference

Dallas Mavericks seasons
Dallas
Dallas
Dallas